Galloway is a census-designated place (CDP) and coal town in northwestern Barbour County, West Virginia, United States.  It lies along West Virginia Route 76 northwest of the city of Philippi, the county seat of Barbour County.  Its elevation is 1,073 feet (327 m).  It has a post office with the ZIP code 26349. As of the 2010 census, its population is 143.

The community was named after W. T. Galloway, a railroad official.

References

Census-designated places in Barbour County, West Virginia
Census-designated places in West Virginia
Coal towns in West Virginia